is a racing video game developed and published by Nintendo for the Super Nintendo Entertainment System. The game was released in Japan on November 21, 1990, in North America in August 1991, and in Europe in 1992. F-Zero is the first game of the F-Zero series and was a launch title for the SNES. It was released for the Virtual Console service on various Nintendo platforms over the years and as part of the Super NES Classic Edition in 2017.

The game takes place in the year 2560, where multi-billionaires with lethargic lifestyles created a new form of entertainment based on the Formula One races called "F-Zero". The player can choose between one of four characters in the game, each with their respective hovercar. The player can race against computer-controlled characters in fifteen tracks divided into three leagues.

F-Zero has been acknowledged by critics as one of the greatest video games of all time as well for setting the standard for the racing genre and the creation of its futuristic subgenre. Critics lauded F-Zero for its fast and challenging gameplay, variety of tracks, and extensive use of the graphical mode called "Mode 7." This graphics-rendering technique was an innovative technological achievement at the time that made racing games more realistic, the first of which was F-Zero. As a result, it is credited for reinvigorating the genre and inspiring the future creation of numerous racing games.

Gameplay

F-Zero is a futuristic racing game where players compete in a high-speed racing tournament called "F-Zero". There are four F-Zero characters. Each has their own selectable hovercar, and each hovercar has its own unique performance abilities. The objective of the game is to beat opponents to the finish line while avoiding hazards such as slip zones and magnets that pull the vehicle off-center in an effort to make the player damage their vehicle or fall completely off the track. Each machine has a power meter, which serves as a measurement of the machine's durability; it decreases when the machine collides with land mines, the side of the track or another vehicle. Energy can be replenished by driving over pit areas placed along the home straight or nearby.

A race in F-Zero consists of five laps around the track. The player must complete each lap in a successively higher place to avoid disqualification from the race. For each lap completed, the player is rewarded with an approximate four-second speed boost called the "Super Jet" and a number of points determined by place. An on-screen display will be shaded green to indicate that a boost can be used; however, the player is limited to saving up to three at a time. If a certain number of points are accumulated, an extra "spare machine" is acquired that gives the player another chance to retry the course. Tracks may feature two methods for temporarily boosting speeds; jump plates launch vehicles into the air thus providing additional acceleration for those not at full speed and dash zones greatly increases the racer's speed on the ground. F-Zero includes two modes of play. In the Grand Prix mode, the player chooses a league and races against other vehicles through each track in that league while avoiding disqualification. The Practice mode allows the player to practice seven of the courses from the Grand Prix mode.

F-Zero has a total of fifteen tracks divided into three leagues ordered by increasing difficulty: Knight, Queen, and King. Furthermore, each league has four selectable difficulty levels: beginner, standard, expert, and master.  The multiple courses of Death Wind, Port Town, and Red Canyon have a pathway that is not accessible unless the player is on another iteration of those tracks, which then in turn closes the path previously available. Unlike most F-Zero games, there are three iterations of Mute City that shows it in either a day, evening, or night setting. In BS F-Zero 2, Mute City IV continued the theme with an early morning setting.

Setting
F-Zero is set in the year 2560, when humanity's multiple encounters with alien life forms had resulted in the expansion of Earth's social framework. This led to commercial, technological and cultural interchanges between planets. The multi-billionaires who earned their wealth through intergalactic trade were mainly satisfied with their lifestyles, although most coveted more entertainment in their lives. This resulted in a new entertainment based on the Formula One races to be founded with vehicles that could hover one foot above the track. These Grand Prix races were soon named "F-Zero" after a rise in popularity of the races. The game introduced the first set of F-Zero racers: Captain Falcon, Dr. Stewart, Pico, and Samurai Goroh. IGN claimed Captain Falcon "was thrust into the limelight" in this game since he was the "star character". An eight-page comic was included in its SNES manual that carried the reader through one of Captain Falcon's bounty missions.

Development and releases
F-Zero was released alongside the SNES in Japan on November 21, 1990, in North America in August 1991, and in Europe in 1992. Only it and Super Mario World were initially available for the Japanese launch. In North America, Super Mario World shipped with the console, and other initial titles included F-Zero, Pilotwings, SimCity, and Gradius III. The game was produced by Shigeru Miyamoto and directed by Kazunobu Shimizu who also worked on art. Takaya Imamura, one of the art designers for the game, was surprised to be able to so freely design F-Zeros characters and courses as he wanted since it was his first game. Yasunari Nishida served as the main programmer. A total of nine people including three programmers worked in house on F-Zero. It was common practice for personnel to take on multiple roles for SNES game development.

Mode 7 is a form of texture mapping available on the SNES which allows a raster graphical plane to be rotated and scaled freely, simulating the appearance of 3D environments without processing any polygons. The Mode 7 rendering applied in F-Zero consists of a single-layer which is scaled and rotated around the vehicle. This pseudo-3D capability of the SNES was designed to be represented by the game. 1UP.com's Jeremy Parish stated that F-Zero and Pilotwings "existed almost entirely for the sake of showing [the system's pseudo-3D capabilities] off" as they outclassed the competition.

The game was downloadable over the Nintendo Power peripheral in Japan and was also released as a demo onto the Nintendo Super System in 1991. An F-Zero jazz album was released on March 25, 1992, in Japan by Tokuma Japan Communications. It features twelve songs from the game on a single disc composed by Yumiko Kanki and Naoto Ishida, and arranged by Robert Hill and Michiko Hill. The album also features Marc Russo (saxophones) of the Yellowjackets and Robben Ford (electric guitar). The game was re-released for the Virtual Console service on the Wii in late 2006, then on the Wii U in February 2013, followed by its New Nintendo 3DS release in March 2016. Nintendo re-released F-Zero in September 2017 as part of the company's Super NES Classic Edition. It was also later included as one of the 20 SNES titles for Nintendo Switch Online subscribers in September 2019.

Reception

F-Zero was widely lauded by game critics for its graphical realism, and has been called the fastest and most fluid pseudo-3D racing game of its time for home systems. This has been mostly credited to the development team's pervasive use of the "Mode 7" system.  Eurogamer's Tom Bramwell commented "this abundance of Mode 7 was unheard of" for the SNES. This graphics-rendering technique was an innovative technological achievement at the time that made racing games more realistic, the first of which was F-Zero. Jeremy Parish of Electronic Gaming Monthly wrote that the game's use of Mode 7 created the "most convincing racetracks that had ever been seen on a home console" that gave "console gamers an experience even more visceral than could be found in the arcades." 1UP.com editor Ravi Hiranand agreed, arguing F-Zeros combination of fast-paced racing and free-range of motion were superior compared to that of previous home console games. IGN's Peer Schneider assured readers F-Zero was one of the few 16-bit era video games to "perfectly combine presentation and functionality to create a completely new gaming experience".

The game was praised for its variety of tracks, and steady increase in difficulty. GameSpy's Jason D'Aprile thought the game "was something of a finesse racer. It took lots of practice, good memorization skills, and a rather fine sense of control." Matt Taylor of The Virginian-Pilot commented that the game is more about "reflexes than realism", and it lacked the ability to save progress between races. F-Zeros soundtrack was lauded.

In GameSpot's retrospective review by Greg Kasavin, he praised F-Zeros controls, longevity and track design. Kasavin felt the title offered exceptional gameplay, with "a perfect balance of pick-up-and-play accessibility and sheer depth". Retrospective reviews agreed that the game should have used a multiplayer mode. IGN's Lucas Thomas criticized the lack of a substantial plot and mentioned F-Zero "doesn't have the same impact these days" suggesting "the sequels on GBA very much pick up where this title left off". In 2009, Official Nintendo Magazine called the game "Blisteringly fast, seriously challenging and insanely fun", ranking the game 66th on a list of greatest Nintendo games.

Accolades
In 1997 Electronic Gaming Monthly ranked it the 18th best console video game of all time, citing its tight controls, the different handling characteristics of the four craft, and the competitive opponent AI. IGN ranked F-Zero as the 91st best game ever in 2003, discussing its originality at time of release and as the 97th best game ever in 2005, describing it as still "respected as one of the all-time top racers". ScrewAttack placed it as the 18th best SNES game. In 2018, Complex listed F-Zero 31st on it’s "The Best Super Nintendo Games of All Time." In 1995, Total! rated the game 50th on their Top 100 SNES Games summarizing: "It’s old and basic but this garish futuristic offering still pushes your driving skills to the limit.

Legacy
F-Zero has been credited with being the game that set a standard for the racing genre and inventing the "futuristic racing" subgenre of video games. IGN credits the game for having inspired the future creation of numerous racing games inside and out of the futuristic subgenre, including the Wipeout series and Daytona USA. Toshihiro Nagoshi, President of Sega's Amusement Vision, stated in 2002 that F-Zero "actually taught me what a game should be" and that it served as an influence for him to create Daytona USA and other racing games. Amusement Vision collaborated with Nintendo to develop F-Zero GX and AX, with Nagoshi serving as one of the co-producers for these games.

Sequels

Nintendo initially developed the sequel of the first F-Zero game for the SNES, although it was broadcast in several versions on the St.GIGA subscription service for the Satellaview attachment of the Super Famicom instead. Using this add-on, players could download titles via satellite and save it onto a flash ROM cartridge for temporary play. The sequel was released under the Japanese names of BS F-Zero Grand Prix and BS F-Zero Grand Prix 2 during the mid-1990s. BS F-Zero Grand Prix contained a new track along with the original 15 tracks from the SNES game and four different playable vehicles. According to Nintendo Power, the game was under consideration for a North American release via Game Pak. IGN states BS F-Zero Grand Prix 2 features one new league containing five tracks, a Grand Prix and a Practice mode.

Although the F-Zero franchise made the transition to 3D graphics on the Nintendo 64 with the release of F-Zero X in 1998, Mode 7 graphical effects continued to be used for the Game Boy Advance (GBA) installments Maximum Velocity and GP Legend. The third sequel F-Zero: Maximum Velocity was released for the GBA in 2001. This installment was described by GameSpy as a hard overhaul of F-Zero and featured improvements to its graphical effects. F-Zero GX and AX, released for the GameCube and the Triforce arcade system board respectively in 2003, was the first significant video game collaboration between Nintendo and Sega. GX is the first F-Zero game to include a story mode, while AX was called by GameSpot as the first to get a "proper arcade release". The most recent installment in the series, F-Zero Climax, was released for the GBA in 2004 and is the first F-Zero game to have a built-in track editor without the need for an expansion or add-on.

Notes

References

Bibliography

External links
 F-Zero at Nintendo.com 
 F-Zero at Nintendo.co.jp

1990 video games
F-Zero
New Nintendo 3DS games
Nintendo Entertainment Analysis and Development games
Nintendo Switch Online games
Racing video games
Satellaview games
Single-player video games
Super Nintendo Entertainment System games
Video games developed in Japan
Video games produced by Shigeru Miyamoto
Video games set on fictional planets
Video games with 2.5D graphics
Virtual Console games for Nintendo 3DS
Virtual Console games for Wii
Virtual Console games for Wii U